Charleston Township is one of twelve townships in Coles County, Illinois, USA.  As of the 2010 census, its population was 23,916 and it contained 9,497 housing units.  Eastern Illinois University is located in this township.

History
Charleston Township was named for one of its founders, Charles Morton.

Geography

Cities, towns, villages
 Charleston (west three-quarters)

Cemeteries
The township contains fourteen cemeteries: Adkins, Chambers, Cossel, Fudge, Huckaba, Kickapoo, Lumbrick, Mound, Old Charleston, Roselawn, Salem, Stoner, Unity and Yocum.

Major highways
  Illinois Route 16
  Illinois Route 130

Landmarks
 Coles County Fairgrounds
 Eastern Illinois University
 Horse Racing Track

Demographics

School districts
 Charleston Community Unit School District 1

Political districts
 Illinois's 15th congressional district
 State House District 110
 State Senate District 55

References
 
 United States Census Bureau 2007 TIGER/Line Shapefiles
 United States National Atlas

External links
 City-Data.com
 Illinois State Archives

Adjacent townships 

Townships in Coles County, Illinois
Populated places established in 1859
Townships in Illinois
1859 establishments in Illinois